Rajan Raj Shiwakoti is a Nepalese folk and film songwriter, composer and singer.

Biography
Shiwakoti was born in Dolakha District of Nepal. He is married to Kabita Mainali.

Music carrier
Shiwakoti has composed, written and sang some notable songs such as

Songs
 Surke Thaili Khai as composer and song-writer
 Kutu Ma Kutu as composer and song-writer 
 Phul Butte Sari  as composer and song-writer 
 Barta Garaideu as composer, writer and song-writer
 Gojima Dam Chaina
 Purba Paschim Rail
 Ukusmukus 
 Jau Maya Jau (Nepali:जाउँ माया जाउँ)

Albums
Some of the music albums of Siwakoti are:
 Lok Teheri 
 Lok Teheri part 2

Awards
 Sixth NFDC National Film Awards for Kutuma Kutu from the movie Dui Rupaiyan
Hits FM Music Awards 2019 - best song for motion picture 
Hits FM Music Awards 2020 - best song for motion picture, for Goji ma Daam Chaina

References

21st-century Nepalese male singers
Nepalese singer-songwriters
People from Dolakha District
Year of birth missing (living people)
Living people
Nepalese playback singers